Malindo is an administrative ward in the Rungwe district of the Mbeya Region of Tanzania. In 2016 the Tanzania National Bureau of Statistics report there were 6,569 people in the ward, from 5,960 in 2012.

References

Wards of Mbeya Region